The Shamokin Shammies played baseball in the first New York-Pennsylvania League in 1925, going 54-77, last in the eight team league. They were formed when the Oneonta Indians relocated to Shamokin, Pennsylvania after the 1924 season. The team changed its name to the Shamokin Indians for the 1926 through 1928 seasons.

Notable alumni
Jim Curry
Harry Davis
Ollie Hanson
Glenn Killinger
LaRue Kirby
Rudy Kneisch
Red Lutz
Dutch Schesler
Amos Strunk

Year-by-year record

Baseball teams established in 1925
Baseball teams disestablished in 1925
Defunct baseball teams in Pennsylvania
1925 establishments in Pennsylvania
1927 disestablishments in Pennsylvania